The 2012–13 Ukrainian Second League was the 22nd season of 3rd level professional football in Ukraine. There are two groups of competition divided by region. The competition began on 13 July 2012 when Hirnyk-Sport Komsomolsk visited Sevastopol to play against FC Sevastopol-2 and lost 3–1.

Competition information

Stage details
The competition for the 2012–13 season has been changed from previous seasons 2 stages.

The first stage will be a round robin competition similar to the previous seasons. The first stage of the competition will be played prior to the winter break. Each team will play with other teams two games (one home, one away).

The second stage will begin the spring of 2013. Teams will be divided into 4 groups. The first stage Groups A and B will be split into two pools one of teams playing for promotion to the First League, another of teams competing to remain in the Second League. Each team in a group will play with every other team two games in a round robin competition. The first two groups The top six teams of the first stage Groups A and B will advance. All points accumulated in the first stage will carry over. The champions of the Groups 1 and 2 will be directly promoted to the Ukrainian First League. The top teams of Groups 1 and 2 will also qualify for a championship play-off for the title of the Second League Champion as in the previous season.

The second place teams of both groups will qualify for a promotion/relegation play-off against the 15th and 16th placed teams of the 2012–13 Ukrainian First League. In the case of exclusion and/or withdrawal of teams from the First League during the season the format of the promotion/relegation play-off will change.

Teams will enter Groups 3 and 4 that are placed below the sixth place in Groups A and B in the first stage. Initially, These teams will play for the rights to remain in the Ukrainian Second League but due to the withdrawal for teams the competition was reformated for the second stage. (See Favbet tournament)

The Ukrainian Second League will be consolidated to twenty teams for the 2013–14 season.

Placing
The placing of teams in the table of all stages is done in the following order:
 number of accumulated points
 difference (GD) between goals for (GF) and goals allowed (GA)
 number of goals scored
 head-to-head results (points, goal difference, higher number of goals scored) among the teams that are tired after applying of the criteria above 
 the League Fair-play ranking (based on all season matches)

The play-offs will consist of two games where each team will play one game at home and another away. The tiebreak rules will be based primarily on the record of the both games and secondarily on the goals scored in away game. In case when all the conditions will not identify a winner, the second game will go into an extra time and, if necessary, the penalty shootout.

Team changes

Admitted teams

The following teams were admitted by the PFL after playing in the 2012 Ukrainian Football Amateur League and passing attestation.

SKA Odesa – initial group stage (debut)
Obolon-2 Kyiv – UPL youth competitions (returning after an absence of four seasons)
Zhemchuzhyna Yalta – initial group stage (debut)
FC Ternopil – initial group stage (returning after an absence of 11 seasons)
 FC Ternopil is regarded as a successor of FC Nyva Ternopil-2.
The teams admitted without playing at amateur league
FC Poltava-2 Karlivka – (debut)

Omitted teams 

Prior to the season it was expected that FC Lviv (relegated from the 2011–12 Ukrainian First League), Nyva Vinnytsia (withdrew from PFL and then reapplied) and Bastion Illichivsk (license granted after absence of one year) would participate in the competition. All three teams informed that they would not enter the competition one day before the competition was to start.(13 July 2012)

Name changes 

Last season FC UkrAhroKom Pryiutivka entered the PFL with the registered address of their parent company UkrAroKom in Pryiutivka. The club's home ground is located in Holovkivka. Prior to the start of the season the club changed its location with the PFL to Holovkivka.

First stage

Group A

Location map

Final standings

Results

Group B

Location map

Final standings

Results

Second stage
The draw for the second stage of season took place on 19 February 2013 and only for the top six teams of each group from the first stage. The second stage will commence 6 April 2013.

The Favbet tournament for Groups 3 and 4 was announced on 4 April 2013 for teams that did not qualify for Group 1 or Group 2.

Group 1

Final standings

Results

Top scorers

Group 2

Final standings

Results

Top scorers

Notes:

Favbet tournament
Due to a number of withdrawals during the winter break it necessitated that the PFL change the competition structure for the Second Stage for Groups 3 and 4. On 4 April 2013 a draw took place for clubs that placed at bottom halves after the autumn half of season. For sponsorship purposes the tournament titled as the Favbet Tournament and as previously planned is composed of two groups. The changes were reviewed and accepted by the FFU Executive Committee on 3 April 2013. The four teams in Group 3 will not have their points transferred from the first stage of the competition, while the Group 4 teams will continue on with the points they gained in the first stage. The paragraph 17 of the Article 13 about relegation of teams from the Second League was suspended.
Games in both Groups (3 and 4) are scheduled to resume on 13 April 2013.

Group 3

Final standings

Results

Top scorers

Group 4

Final standings

Results

Top scorers

Notes:

Championship matches
The title of the Second League Champion will be played by the Group 1 and Group 2 winners at the end of the season. The matches will be played in a home and away series. The draw for the matches was made on 6 June 2013.

First leg

Second leg

3–3 on aggregate. Desna Chernihiv won on away goals.

Notes:

Promotion/relegation play-off
A promotion/relegation home and away play-off were played by the 2nd team in Group 1 and 2 of 2012–13 Ukrainian Second League against the 15th and 16th placed teams of the 2012–13 Ukrainian First League competition. Dynamo-2 Kyiv and FC Odesa qualified for the play-off. The draw for the play-off matches was held on 7 June.

Match #1

First leg

Second leg

6–1 on aggregate. Nyva Ternopil promoted to First League

Match #2

First leg

Second leg

2–1 on aggregate. Shakhtar Sverdlovsk remain in Second League.

See also

 2012–13 Ukrainian Premier League
 2012–13 Ukrainian First League
 2012–13 Ukrainian Cup

References

Ukrainian Second League seasons
3
Ukra